Psychomastax deserticola, the desert monkey grasshopper, is a species of monkey grasshopper in the family Eumastacidae. It is found in North America.

The IUCN conservation status of Psychomastax deserticola is "VU", vulnerable. The species faces a high risk of endangerment in the medium term. The IUCN status was reviewed in 1996.

Subspecies
These two subspecies belong to the species Psychomastax deserticola:
 Psychomastax deserticola deserticola Hebard, 1934
 Psychomastax deserticola indigena Rehn & Grant, 1959

References

Eumastacidae
Articles created by Qbugbot
Insects described in 1934